Koena may refer to:

Koena tribe, a Sotho-Tswana community
Koena (Balé Province)